The 1982 Air Canada Silver Broom, the men's world curling championship, was held from March 29 to April 4 at the Olympic Eisstadion in Garmisch-Partenkirchen, Germany.

Teams

Round-robin standings

Round-robin results

Draw 1

Draw 2

Draw 3

Draw 4

Draw 5

Draw 6

Draw 7

Draw 8

Draw 9

Tiebreakers

Playoffs

Semifinals

Final

External links

Air Canada Silver Broom
Air Canada Silver Broom
Curling competitions in West Germany
International sports competitions hosted by West Germany
Sport in Garmisch-Partenkirchen
Sports competitions in Bavaria
World Men's Curling Championship
Air Canada Silver Broom
Air Canada Silver Broom
Air Canada Silver Broom